Oksyukovo is a rural locality (a village) in Pervomayskoye Rural Settlement, Chagodoshchensky District, Vologda Oblast, Russia. The population was 22 as of 2002.

Geography 
Pervomaysky is the nearest rural locality.

References 

Rural localities in Chagodoshchensky District